Ransom Lloyd Richardson (January 25, 1873 – March 11, 1959) was an American lawyer and politician from New York.

Life 
Richardson was born on January 25, 1873, in Angelica, New York, the son of David P. and Julia S. Richardson.

Richardson attended the local village school. He was in the public schools in Washington, D.C. when his father was in Congress. He then went to the Newton Collegiate Institute in Newton, New Jersey. He graduated from Wilson Academy in Angelica in 1891. He then went to Cornell Law School, graduating from there in 1895. He was admitted to the bar in 1894, and in 1895 he opened a law office in Fillmore and practiced law there. His 1895 thesis from Cornell, "Mistake," was about mistakes in court.

Richardson served as town supervisor from 1906 to 1911. In 1911, he was elected to the New York State Assembly as a Republican, representing Allegany County. He served in the Assembly in 1912 and 1913.

Richardson practiced law for over 57 years. He was married to Ruth L. Their children were Mrs. P. Austin Bleyer of Rochester, David P. of Fillmore, Ransom L. of Flint, Michigan, and Warren S. of Washington Grove, Maryland.

Richardson died at home on March 11, 1959. He was buried in Pine Grove Cemetery in Fillmore.

References

External links 

 The Political Graveyard

1873 births
1959 deaths
People from Angelica, New York
Cornell Law School alumni
19th-century American lawyers
20th-century American lawyers
New York (state) lawyers
20th-century American politicians
Town supervisors in New York (state)
Republican Party members of the New York State Assembly
Burials in New York (state)